The 1989 Rhode Island Rams football team was an American football team that represented the University of Rhode Island in the Yankee Conference during the 1989 NCAA Division I-AA football season. In their 14th season under head coach Bob Griffin, the Rams compiled a 3–8 record (1–7 against conference opponents) and finished in eighth place out of nine teams in the conference.

Schedule

References

Rhode Island
Rhode Island Rams football seasons
Rhode Island Rams football